Arriaga Municipality is one of the 122 municipalities of Chiapas, in southern Mexico.

As of 2010, the municipality had a total population of 40,042, up from 34,032 in 2005.

As of 2010, the city of Arriaga had a population of 24,447. Other than the city of Arriaga, the municipality had 464 localities, the largest of which (with 2010 populations in parentheses) were: Emiliano Zapata (3,353), classified as urban, and Azteca (La Punta) (1,829), La Gloria (1,801), La Línea (1,452), and Lázaro Cárdenas (1,172), classified as rural.

The name of the city honours Ponciano Arriaga, the name given to it upon creation of the municipality on 28 May 1910. It was given city status on 1 December 1943.

References

Municipalities of Chiapas